Hokkien opera may refer to several different Chinese opera genres in the Hokkien or Southern Min topolect, which are mainly performed in southern Fujian, Taiwan, and Southeast Asia (Singapore, Malaysia, Indonesia, and Philippines):

Taiwanese opera (歌仔戲), usually known as Xiang opera (薌劇) in Singapore (and for a time in Fujian as well)
Kaoka opera (高甲戲)
Lewan opera (梨園戲)
Glove puppetry, very popular with Hokkien speakers

See also
Min opera (閩劇), an opera genre in the Eastern Min topolect, from northeastern coastal Fujian
Puxian opera (莆仙戲), an opera genre in the Pu-Xian Min topolect, from central coastal Fujian